En händig man (A handy man) is a Swedish language album released by Swedish pop-rock singer and composer Per Gessle. The title track "En händig man" was the first single, followed by the Promo / Digital-only single, "Jag skulle vilja tänka en underbar tanke", while the last single was "Pratar med min müsli".

Track listing
"En händig man" – 3.01
"Pratar med min müsli (hur det än verkar)" – 3.04
"Jag skulle vilja tänka en underbar tanke" – 3.16
"Fru Nordin" – 3.07
"Dixy" – 2.51
"När Karolina kom" – 2.51
"Hannas kärlekspil" – 2.11
"Om du kommer ihåg" – 2.59
"Om jag vetat då (vad jag vet nu)" – 3.35
"Tom Tom" – 2.59
"Våldsamt stillsamt" – 2.41
"Trött" – 2.47
"Samma gamla vanliga visa" – 2.31
"Min hälsning" – 3.23

Digital downloads only
"En händig man" (Tits & Ass Demo 13 Juli 2006) * Digital Release only *
"Ett perfekt ägg" (Instrumental) * Digital Release only *
"En händig man" (blåser) ** Telia Version only **

Deluxe version bonus EP
"Hon vill sväva över ängarna" – 2.31
"Signal" – 2.56
"Solen kom från ingenstans" – 2.49
"Du kommer så nära (du blir alldeles suddig)" – 3.06

Charts

References

Per Gessle albums
2007 albums